Ballads from Deep Gap is the second studio album by American folk music artist Doc Watson and Merle Watson, released in 1967. The title references the town Watson was born in —  Deep Gap, North Carolina.

Two of the songs were co-written with fiddler Gaither Carlton, Doc's father-in-law.

Reception

Writing for Allmusic, music critic Jim Smith wrote of the album "The largely overlooked Ballads from Deep Gap features a great song list and some of Doc & Merle Watson's best early playing."

Track listing
 "Roll in My Sweet Baby's Arms" (Lester Flatt) –  2:49
 "My Rough and Rowdy Ways" (Elsie McWilliams, Jimmie Rodgers) –  2:28
 "The Wreck of the Old Number Nine" (Carson Robison) –  2:55
 "Gambler's Yodel" (Alton Delmore, Rabon Delmore) – 2:55
 "The Cuckoo" (Traditional) –  2:46
 "Stack-O-Lee" (Traditional) – 3:50
 "Willie Moore" (Traditional) – 4:00
 "Travelin' Man" (Traditional) – 3:28
 "Tragic Romance" (Grandpa Jones) –  3:18
 "Texas Gales" (Molly O'Day) –  1:30
 "The Lawson Family Murder" (Walter "Kid" Smith) –  2:36
 "Alabama Bound" (Traditional) – 2:47

Personnel
Doc Watson – guitar, harmonica, banjo, vocals
Merle Watson – guitar, banjo
Eric Weissberg – bass
Production notes
Jack Lothrop – producer
Clalude Karczmer – engineer
Bill Vernon – liner notes

References

1967 albums
Doc Watson albums
Vanguard Records albums